India's Income Tax Appellate Tribunal (ITAT) was set up on 25 January 1941, and it was the first experiment in tribunalization in the history of India.  It is second appellate authority under the direct taxes and first independent forum in its appellate hierarchy. The orders passed by the ITAT can be subjected to appellate challenge, on substantial questions of law, before the respective High Court.

With a view to ensure highest degree of independence of  the ITAT, it  functions under the Department of Legal Affairs in the Ministry of Law and Justice, and is kept away from any kind of control by the Ministry of Finance.

The appeals before the Income Tax Appellate Tribunal are generally heard by a division bench- consisting of one judicial member and one accountant member. In cases involving assessed income of less than, however, any one Member, though with a work experience of minimum five years in the Tribunal, can decide the appeals in a single member bench as well. In case of conflict of opinions by the division benches on the issues involved in an appeal, the appeals are sometimes heard by the special benches consisting of three of more members- at least one of which must be a judicial member and at least one of which must be an accountant member.

The Indian Income Tax Appellate Tribunal is considered to be a very successful experiment in tribunalization and is often cited to justify more steps in this direction.

References

External links
 Official Website

Indian Tribunals
Income tax in India
1941 establishments in India